Airways International may refer to:

Airways International (defunct Florida airline)
Airways International Cymru (defunct British airline)